San Sebastián District is one of eight districts of the Cusco Province in Peru.

Geography 
Other mountains are listed below:

 Anka Wachana
 Ñustayuq
 Tawqaray
 Wanakawri

Archaeology 
Some of the most important archaeological sites of the district are Chuqik'iraw Pukyu, Inkill Tampu, Pumamarka, Puqin Kancha, Qullqapampa, Rumiwasi and Wayna Tawqaray.

References

External links
  Municipal web site